Lion Flag may refer to:

 Flag of Sri Lanka, featuring a lion and commonly called Lion Flag
 Flag of Flanders, featuring a lion and called Flemish Lion or Lion Flag

See also 

 Bear flag